An ibis is a long-legged bird.

Ibis or IBIS may also refer to:

Aircraft
Hinkler Ibis, a British two-seat monoplane
Junqua Ibis, a French homebuilt aircraft design
Ross R-2 Ibis, an American single-seat glider

Literature
 Ibis the Invincible, a heroic magician appearing in Fawcett Comics and DC Comics
 Ibis (journal), the journal of the British Ornithologists' Union
 Ibis (novel), a 1900 novel by José María Vargas Vila
 Ibis (Ovid), a single extant poem written in elegiac couplets by the Roman poet Ovid
 Ibis trilogy, a work of historical fiction by Amitav Ghosh

Organisations
 Ibis (bicycle company), a bicycle manufacturer
 Ibis (hotel), a hotel company
 Ibis Aerospace, a joint Czech-Taiwan aerospace company
 Ibis School, an international school in Bonn, Germany
 Íbis Sport Club, a Brazilian football (soccer) club
 Oxfam IBIS, a charitable organization of Denmark, known as IBIS until 2016 where it joined Oxfam

People
Ibis Gómez-Vega (born 1952), Cuban-American writer
Ibis Nieves, contestant on Road Rules X-treme Season 13

Ships
Ibis (1886), a steamship
HMAS Ibis, ships of the Royal Australian Navy
, a British Royal Navy sloop commissioned in 1941 and sunk in 1942
, more than one United States Navy ship

Technology
 Interagency Border Inspection System, a United States computer-based system for the law enforcement community
 Integrated Business Information System, a 1980s electronic office system from Plessey
 Input/output Buffer Information Specification, a semiconductor simulation model
 Integrated Ballistics Identification System, developed by Forensic Technology WAI Inc.
 Issue-Based Information System, notation for the Argumentative Design methodology to tackle complex, ill-defined problems that involve multiple stakeholders
 IBIS, an artificial intelligence unit, the villain in the PlayStation 2 video game Silent Line: Armored Core
 In-body image stabilization, a stabilization mechanism built into a camera body rather than into a lens
 IBIS (server), Inferred Biomolecular Interaction Server
 IBIS Interconnect Modeling Specification, an ASCII-based file format

Other uses
 Ibis, Queensland, a locality in the Barcaldine Region, Queensland, Australia
 "Ibis", a song by Can from the album Unlimited Edition

See also
 Ibex (disambiguation)
 Ibus (disambiguation)
 White ibis